Ehrenfels may refer to:

People
 Christian von Ehrenfels (1859-1932), an Austrian philosopher
 Baron Omar Rolf von Ehrenfels (1901-1980), an Austrian anthropologist and orientalist

Places
 Ehrenfels Castle (disambiguation)
 Burg Kammerstein (Ehrenfels), a castle in Styria, Austria

Things
 Ehrenfelser, a white wine grape variety